The Kazakhstan women's national sevens rugby union team is Kazakhstan's representative in Rugby sevens at an international level. They won gold at the 2010 Asian Games defeating China in the finals. They finished third at the 2019 Asia Rugby Women's Sevens Olympic Qualifying Tournament earning themselves a place at the 2020 Olympic repechage tournament to compete for one of two final berths in Tokyo.

Players

Previous squad

Tournament History

Asian Games

References

Asian national women's rugby union teams
Women's national rugby sevens teams
Rugby union in Kazakhstan
W7